Padarath is used in Sikhism for a "step of spiritual Enlightenment." In the Guru Granth Sahib, the term padarath is used for temporal, as well as spiritual, attainments. There are four "Spiritual Treasures" in Sikhism, known as the Char Padarath:
 Gyaan Padarath (ਗਿਆਨੁ ਪਦਾਰਥੁ) — Treasure of Wisdom
 Mukti Padarath (ਮੁਕਤਿ ਪਦਾਰਥੁ)  — Treasure of Liberation
 Naam Padarath (ਨਾਮੁ ਪਦਾਰਥੁ)  — Treasure of Supreme Command (Wisdom from Divine)
 Janam Padarath (ਜਨਮੁ ਪਦਾਰਥੁ)  — Treasure of Living (Supreme Enlightenment)

According to Guru Arjan Dev, if a soul attains Naam Padarath, he gets Janam Padarath automatically. In the Guru Granth Sahib, he mentioned in a salok, "O Nanak, if I am blessed with the Naam, I live, and my body and mind blossom forth." Only the liberated soul can achieve Naam Padarath. The liberation (Mukat Padarath) is attained by accepting wisdom of Guru (Gyan Padarath) and applicable in one's lifestyle. Guru Amar Das states "Through the Spiritual wisdom, the Gurmukh is liberated." All the above tasks are categorized under Hari Ki Seva (Pleasing the one God).

As per Mahankosh, Padarath is a "noun" means a thing or precious thing and as per Hindu Puranas, there are four Padarath which are Dharma, Artha, Kama and Moksha.

References

Primary text

Citations 

Sikh philosophy